The Women's 800 Freestyle swimming event at the 25th SEA Games was held on December 12, 2009.

Results
The women's 800 Free at was swum as a timed final event, meaning that each swimmer only swam the race once and all times were aggregated together for final placing.

References

Swimming at the 2009 Southeast Asian Games
2009 in women's swimming